Fred Freiberger (February 19, 1915March 2, 2003) was an American film and television writer and television producer, whose career spanned four decades and work on such films as The Beast from 20,000 Fathoms (1953) and TV series including Ben Casey (1963–64), The Wild Wild West (1965), Star Trek (1968–69) and Space: 1999 (1976–77).

Freiberger was the producer of the third and final season of science-fiction series Star Trek, between 1968 and 1969. His screenwriting credits include 13 films made between 1946 and 1958. He appeared as himself in the short documentary Funny Old Guys, which aired as part of the HBO series Still Kicking, Still Laughing in 2003, a few months after his death in March.

Freiberger died on March 2, 2003, at his Bel-Air home, according to his son, Ben. No cause of death was given.

Early life and career
Freiberger was born to a Jewish family in New York City. In the late 1930s, Freiberger worked in advertising in New York. During World War II, he was stationed in England with the United States Eighth Air Force, but was shot down over Germany and spent two years as a prisoner of war. After the war, he moved to Hollywood with the intention of working in film publicity, but a studio strike saw him move into screenwriting. He was associated with Buddy Rogers' Comet Productions and Columbia Pictures. He was one of the four credited writers on the monster movie The Beast from 20,000 Fathoms (1953).

Television career
From 1958, Freiberger worked almost exclusively in television. As a writer, he contributed scripts for dozens of tv shows in the period 1952 through 1989. As a producer, his first assignment was in 1960 on the medical drama Ben Casey, followed by a brief stint as producer of The Wild Wild West during its first season (1965–66). In 1968, Freiberger was hired as producer for the third and final season of Star Trek. He then returned to writing, scripting episodes for a number of early-1970s TV series, including All in the Family, Emergency!, Starsky and Hutch and Ironside, and also worked as a story editor at Hanna-Barbera on the TV series The New Scooby-Doo Movies and Super Friends. Freiberger then moved on to produce the second (and last) season of the British sci-fi series Space: 1999 (1976–77), the final season of The Six Million Dollar Man (1977–78), and the short-lived Beyond Westworld (1980). Toward the end of his career, he wrote six episodes of the 1980s syndicated series Superboy.

Producing Star Trek
Freiberger had been interviewed as a possible producer for Star Trek before it entered production in 1966, but had left the selection process due to a planned trip. In 1968, as a result of creative differences with broadcaster NBC, Star Trek creator Gene Roddenberry resigned as showrunner. Freiberger was again contacted and hired as producer for the series' third season. He assumed this role with a reduced budget that made the series more difficult to produce, as well as a new "Friday night death slot" that resulted in a further decline in viewing ratings for what was already a low-rated program. Many Star Trek fans have since criticised Freiberger for being the cause of this decline, but actress Nichelle Nichols (who played Uhura) has written in his defense. Nichols argues that NBC's considerable budget cutbacks to the third season of Star Trek, in an environment of rising production costs and escalating actors' salaries, meant that:

Producing Space: 1999
On 15 December 1975, Freiberger was confirmed as both script editor and producer for the second season of Gerry Anderson's British science-fiction TV series Space: 1999, recruited in part to make the series more appealing to the American market. To that end, Freiberger re-worked the series with major cast and character changes, a heightened emphasis on action and drama, and even ensured that signs appearing in the episodes used American English spelling. He also wrote three episodes for the show's second season, under the pen name "Charles Woodgrove", a pseudonym he had employed when writing for movies and television in the USA: he first used that name as a screenwriter on the movie The Beast from 20,000 Fathoms (1953), and subsequently in writing television episodes of the 1960s Western series Rawhide.

Negative reputation in science fiction fandom
Freiberger has a dubious reputation in science-fiction fandom, due to his involvement in the final seasons of Star Trek, Space: 1999, and The Six Million Dollar Man, all cancelled on his watch (he also produced the cartoon series Josie and the Pussycats in Outer Space, which ran only one season, but most Saturday morning cartoons had short runs). In some circles this resulted in Freiberger being nicknamed "the Showkiller" or "the Serial Killer". Both William Shatner and Nichelle Nichols of Star Trek refused to assign any blame to Freiberger in this manner.  From an interview by Canadian Kevin McCorry with Fred Freiberger in regard to Space: 1999 not being picked up for a third season: "Because the powers in control decided that the first season was not successful does not mean that the productions were not well done in terms of the acting, the directing, the stories. There are many reasons why a series is canceled other than quality of the episodes. Ratings are the economic driving force. Are people watching the series?  Obviously not enough. Lew Grade and his advisors decided that if the show was to succeed in the second year, it could not be the same as the first season. Changes were made. And obviously, the public did not respond so the series came to an end. It seems to me a waste of energy to argue that one year was better than the other—neither season attracted enough audience to sustain the series".

References

External links

Fred Freiberger at Find a Grave

1915 births
2003 deaths
20th-century American businesspeople
American expatriates in the United Kingdom
American prisoners of war in World War II
American science fiction writers
American male screenwriters
American television writers
United States Army Air Forces personnel of World War II
Burials at Mount Sinai Memorial Park Cemetery
Businesspeople from Los Angeles
Businesspeople from New York (state)
People from Hollywood, Los Angeles
Jewish American screenwriters
Television producers from California
World War II prisoners of war held by Germany
Writers from Los Angeles
Place of birth missing
American male novelists
American male television writers
20th-century American novelists
20th-century American male writers
Screenwriters from California
20th-century American screenwriters
20th-century pseudonymous writers
20th-century American Jews
21st-century American Jews